Two ships of the United States Navy have borne the name USS Trigger, named in honor of the triggerfish, any of numerous deep-bodied fishes of warm seas having an anterior dorsal fin with two or three stout erectile spines.

 The first  was a  commissioned in 1942 and sunk in 1945.
 The second  was a  submarine, commissioned in 1952, stricken in 1973 and sold to Italy.

United States Navy ship names